ÜberFacts is an online web service/app that provides people with random facts. There is currently a Twitter version, a mobile app version, Instagram version, and a Facebook version. The service was developed by Kris Sanchez. Sanchez receives the facts through research from books, science articles, the news, and more. He stated that he always confirms the accuracy of the facts prior to releasing them. Mistakes are eventually deleted or updated with corrections.

History

In September 2009, Sanchez was having a "boring day" in New Paltz, so he decided to look up useless facts to kill time. He wanted an account that had purpose since his personal didn't have one, so he then created UberFacts. UberFacts became increasingly more popular due to tweeting at all times of the day, because back in September, Sanchez only tweeted during the day.

Twitter hacked
On May 21, 2014, the UberFacts Twitter account was hacked, the hacker sent vulgar messages out. Sanchez noticed this and tweeted on his personal account that the hacker will have to pay him for every tweet the hacker owes him. On the next day, Sanchez recovered UberFacts, and announced that his account was hacked and felt sorry if anyone got offended by the vulgar messages the hacker sent out.

Reception
A March 2014 BuzzFeed article panned UberFacts for its occasionally incorrect facts, justifying why they are occasionally inaccurate. BuzzFeed then sent an email to Sanchez inquiring if the facts provided are incorrect, he responded saying that the accuracy of his facts are reviewed prior to releasing them and he does not cite sources because not everyone would want to see a link at the end of a tweet.

Sanchez stated that he earns approximately US$500,000 per year through Uberfacts, and expects that number to increase in the future due to the release of a dedicated app.

References

External links
 

Twitter accounts
American websites